The English language spoken and written in England encompasses a diverse range of accents and dialects. The language forms part of the broader British English, along with other varieties in the United Kingdom. Terms used to refer to the English language spoken and written in England include: English English and Anglo-English.

The related term British English has many ambiguities and tensions in the word British, so it can be used and interpreted in multiple ways, but it is usually reserved to describe the features common to Anglo-English, Welsh English and Scottish English (England, Wales and Scotland are the three traditional countries on the island of Great Britain; the main dialect of the fourth country of the United Kingdom, Northern Ireland, is Ulster English, which is generally considered a dialect of Hiberno-English).

General features
There are many different accents and dialects throughout England and people are often very proud of their local accent or dialect. However, accents and dialects also highlight social class differences, rivalries or other associated prejudices—as illustrated by George Bernard Shaw's comment:

As well as pride in one's accent, there is also stigma placed on many traditional working class dialects. In his work on the dialect of Bolton, Graham Shorrocks wrote:

The three largest recognisable dialect groups in England are Southern English dialects, Midlands English dialects and Northern English dialects. The most prominent isogloss is the foot–strut split, which runs roughly from mid-Shropshire (on the Welsh border) to south of Birmingham and then to the Wash.

Most native English speakers can tell the general region in England that a speaker comes from, and experts or locals may be able to narrow this down to within a few miles. Historically, such differences could be a major impediment to understanding between people from different areas. There are also many cases where a large city has a very different accent from the rural area around it (e.g. Bristol and Avon, Hull and the East Riding, Liverpool and Lancashire). But modern communications and mass media have reduced these differences in some parts of the country. Speakers may also change their pronunciation and vocabulary, particularly towards Received Pronunciation and Standard English when in public.

British and Irish varieties of English, including Anglo-English, are discussed in John C. Wells (1982). Some of the features of Anglo-English are that:

 Most versions of this dialect have non-rhotic pronunciation, meaning that /r/ is not pronounced in syllable coda position. Non-rhoticity is also found elsewhere in the English-speaking world, including in Australian English, New Zealand English, South African English, New York City English, and a few, particular dialects of Southern American English, as well as most non-native varieties spoken throughout the Commonwealth of Nations. Rhotic accents exist in the West Country, parts of Lancashire, the far north of England and in the town of Corby, the last two of which have a large Scottish influence on their speech. Additionally, people who are children of at least one American, Canadian, Irish or Scottish and thus rhotic-accented parent but grew up, or were educated, in England speak non-rhotic.
 In the Southern varieties, words like bath, cast, dance, fast, after, castle, grass etc. are pronounced with the long vowel found in calm (that is,  or a similar vowel) while in the Midlands and Northern varieties they are pronounced with the same vowel as trap or cat, usually . For more details see Trap–bath split. There are some areas of the West Country that use  in both the TRAP and BATH sets. The Bristol area, although in the south of England, uses the short  in BATH.
 Many varieties undergo h-dropping, making harm and arm homophones. This is a feature of working-class accents across most of England, but was traditionally stigmatised (a fact the comedy musical My Fair Lady was quick to exploit) but less so now. This was geographically widespread, but the linguist A.C.Gimson stated that it did not extend to the far north, nor to East Anglia, Essex, Wiltshire or Somerset. In the past, working-class people were often unsure where an h ought to be pronounced, and, when attempting to speak "properly", would often preface any word that began with a vowel with an h (e.g. "henormous" instead of enormous, "hicicles" instead of icicles); this was referred to as the "hypercorrect h" in the Survey of English Dialects, and is also referenced in literature (e.g. the policeman in Danny the Champion of the World).
 A glottal stop for intervocalic  is now common amongst younger speakers across the country; it was originally confined to some areas of the south-east and East Anglia.
 Most varieties have the horse–hoarse merger. However, some northern accents retain the distinction, pronouncing pairs of words like for/four, horse/hoarse and morning/mourning differently.
 Many Southern varieties have the bad–lad split, so that bad  and lad  do not rhyme.
This can be found as far north as Wakefield and as far south as Essex. This is unusual in being an east-west division in pronunciation when English dialects generally divide between north and south. Another east-west division involves the rhotic ; it can be heard in the speech of country folk (particularly the elder), more or less west of the course of the Roman era road known as Watling Street (the modern A5), which at one time divided King Alfred's Wessex and English Mercia from the Danish kingdoms in the east. The rhotic  is rarely found in the east.
 Sporadically, miscellaneous items of generally obsolete vocabulary survive: come in the past tense rather than came; the use of thou and/or ye for you.

Change over time
There has been academic interest in dialects since the late 19th century. The main works are On Early English Pronunciation by A.J. Ellis, English Dialect Grammar by Joseph Wright, and the English Dialect Dictionary also by Joseph Wright. The Dialect Test was developed by Joseph Wright so he could hear the differences of the vowel sounds of a dialect by listening to different people reading the same short passage of text.

In the 1950s and 1960s the Survey of English Dialects was undertaken to preserve a record of the traditional spectrum of rural dialects that merged into each other. The traditional picture was that there would be a few changes in lexicon and pronunciation every couple of miles, but that there would be no sharp borders between completely different ways of speaking. Within a county, the accents of the different towns and villages would drift gradually so that residents of bordering areas sounded more similar to those in neighbouring counties.

Because of greater social mobility and the teaching of "Standard English" in secondary schools, this model is no longer very accurate. There are some English counties in which there is little change in accent/dialect, and people are more likely to categorise their accent by a region or county than by their town or village. As agriculture became less prominent, many rural dialects were lost. Some urban dialects have also declined; for example, traditional Bradford dialect is now quite rare in the city, and call centres have seen Bradford as a useful location for the very fact there is a lack of dialect in potential employees. Some call centres state that they were attracted to Bradford because it has a regional accent which is relatively easy to understand. But working in the opposite direction concentrations of migration may cause a town or area to develop its own accent. The two most famous examples are Liverpool and Corby. Liverpool's dialect is influenced heavily by Irish and Welsh, and it sounds completely different from surrounding areas of Lancashire. Corby's dialect is influenced heavily by Scots, and it sounds completely different from the rest of Northamptonshire. The Voices 2006 survey found that the various ethnic minorities that have settled in large populations in parts of Britain develop their own specific dialects. For example, Asian may have an Oriental influence on their accent so sometimes urban dialects are now just as easily identifiable as rural dialects, even if they are not from South Asia. In the traditional view, urban speech was just seen as a watered-down version of that of the surrounding rural area. Historically, rural areas had much more stable demographics than urban areas, but there is now only a small difference. It has probably never been true since the Industrial Revolution caused an enormous influx to cities from rural areas.

Overview of regional accents
According to dialectologist Peter Trudgill, the major regional English accents of modern England can be divided on the basis on the following basic features; the word columns each represent the pronunciation of one italicised word in the sentence "Very few cars made it up the long hill". Two additional distinguishing features—the absence or presence of a trap-bath split and the realisation of the  vowel—are also represented under the "path" and "stone" columns (so that the sentence could be rendered "Very few cars made it up the path of the long stone hill").

Southern England

In general, Southern English accents are distinguished from Northern English accents primarily by not using the short a in words such as "bath". This sometimes occurs before : it is used in "command" and "demand" but not in "brand" or "grand".

In the south-west, an  sound is used in these words but also in words that take  in RP; there is no trap–bath split but both are pronounced with an extended fronted vowel. Bristol is an exception to the bath-broadening rule: it uses  in the trap and bath sets, just as is the case in the North and the Midlands.

Accents originally from the upper class speech of the London–Oxford–Cambridge triangle are particularly notable as the basis for Received Pronunciation.

Southern English accents have three main historical influences:
London accent, Cockney in particular
Received Pronunciation
Southern rural accents (such as West Country, Kent and East Anglian)

Relatively recently, the first two have increasingly influenced southern accents outside London via social class mobility and the expansion of London. From some time during the 19th century, middle and upper middle classes began to adopt affectations, including the RP accent, associated with the upper class. In the late 20th and 21st century other social changes, such as middle class RP-speakers forming an increasing component of rural communities, have accentuated the spread of RP. The South East coast accents traditionally have several features in common with the West Country; for example, rhoticity and the a: sound in words such as bath, cast, etc. However, the younger generation in the area is more likely to be non-rhotic and use the London/East Anglian A: sound in bath.

After the Second World War, about one million Londoners were relocated to new and expanded towns throughout the south east, bringing with them their distinctive London accent.

During the 19th century distinct dialects of English were recorded in Sussex, Surrey and Kent. These dialects are now extinct or nearly extinct due to improved communications and population movements.

South West England

The West Country dialects and accents are the English dialects and accents used by much of the indigenous population of South West England, the area popularly known as the West Country.

This region encompasses Bristol, Cornwall, Devon, Dorset and Somerset, while Gloucestershire, Herefordshire and Wiltshire are usually also included, although the northern and eastern boundaries of the area are hard to define and sometimes even wider areas are encompassed. The West Country accent is said to reflect the pronunciation of the Anglo-Saxons far better than other modern English Dialects.

In the nearby counties of Berkshire, Oxfordshire, Hampshire and the Isle of Wight, it was possible to encounter comparable accents and, indeed, distinct local dialects until perhaps the 1960s. There is now limited use of such dialects amongst older people in local areas. Although natives of such locations, especially in western parts, can still have West Country influences in their speech, the increased mobility and urbanisation of the population have meant that local Berkshire, Oxfordshire, Hampshire and Isle of Wight dialects (as opposed to accents) are today essentially extinct.

Academically the regional variations are considered to be dialectal forms. The Survey of English Dialects captured manners of speech across the West Country that were just as different from Standard English as anything from the far North. Close proximity has completely different languages such as Cornish, which is a Celtic language related to Welsh, and more closely to Breton. The Cornish dialect of English spoken in Cornwall by Cornish people is to some extent influenced by Cornish grammar, and often includes words derived from the language.

Norfolk
The Norfolk dialect is spoken in the traditional county of Norfolk and areas of north Suffolk. Famous speakers include Keith Skipper.
The group FOND (Friends of Norfolk Dialect) was formed to record the county's dialect and to provide advice for TV companies using the dialect in productions.

East Anglian dialect is also spoken in areas of Cambridgeshire.

Midlands
 As in the North, Midlands accents generally do not use a broad A, so that cast is pronounced  rather than the  pronunciation of most southern accents.
 The West Midlands accent is often described as having a pronounced nasal quality, the East Midlands accent much less so.
 Old and cold may be pronounced as "owd" and "cowd" (rhyming with "loud" in the West Midlands and "ode" in the East Midlands), and in the northern Midlands home can become "wom".
 Whether Derbyshire should be classed as the West or East Midlands in terms of dialect is debatable. Stanley Ellis, a dialect expert, said in 1985 that it was more like the West Midlands, but it is often grouped with the East and is part of the region East Midlands.
 Cheshire, although part of the North-West region, is usually grouped the Midlands for the purpose of accent and dialect.

West Midlands
 The best known accents in the West Midlands area are the Birmingham accents (see "Brummie") and the Black Country accent (Yam Yam).
 There is no Ng-coalescence. Wells noted that there were no exceptions to this rule in Stoke-on-Trent, whereas there were for other areas with the  pronunciation, such as Liverpool.
 Dialect verbs are used, for example am for are, ay for is not (related to ain't), bay for are not, bin for am or, emphatically, for are. Hence the following joke dialogue about bay windows: "What sort of windas am them?" "They'm bay windas." "Well if they bay windas wot bin them?". There is also humour to be derived from the shop-owner's sign of Mr. "E. A. Wright" (that is, "He ay [isn't] right," a phrase implying someone is saft [soft] in the jed [head]). Saft also may mean silly as in, "Stop bein' so saft".
 The Birmingham and Coventry accents are distinct, even though the cities are only 19 miles/30 km apart. Coventry being closer to an East Midlands accent. 
 Around Stoke-on-Trent, the short i can sometimes sound rather like ee, as very obvious when hearing a local say it, however this is not always the case as most other words such as "miss" or "tip" are still pronounced as normal. The Potteries accent is perhaps the most distinctly 'northern' of the West Midlands accents, given that the urban area around Stoke-on-Trent is close to the Cheshire border.
 Herefordshire and parts of Worcestershire and Shropshire have a rhotic accent  somewhat like the West Country, and in some parts mixing with the Welsh accent, particularly when closer to the English/Welsh border.

East Midlands
 East Midlands accents are generally non-rhotic, instead drawing out their vowels, resulting in the Midlands Drawl, which can to non-natives be mistaken for dry sarcasm. 
  In Lincolnshire, sounds like the u vowel of words like strut being realised as  may be even shorter than in the North.
 In Leicester, words with short vowels such as up and last have a northern pronunciation, whereas words with vowels such as down and road sound rather more like a south-eastern accent. The vowel sound at the end of words like border (and the name of the city) is also a distinctive feature.
 Lincolnshire also has a marked north–south split in terms of accent. The north (around Grimsby and Scunthorpe) shares many features with Yorkshire, such as the open a sound in "car" and "park" or the replacement of take and make with tek and mek. The south of Lincolnshire is close to Received Pronunciation, although it still has a short Northern a in words such as bath. Accents in the north of the county are often classified as a form of Yorkshire, influenced by Hull, Doncaster and Sheffield.
 Mixing of the words was and were when the other is used in Standard English.
 In Northamptonshire, crossed by the North-South isogloss, residents of the north of the county have an accent similar to that of Leicestershire and those in the south an accent similar to rural Oxfordshire.
 The town of Corby in northern Northamptonshire has an accent with some originally Scottish features, apparently due to immigration of Scottish steelworkers. This pronunciation is used across Scotland and most of Northern England, but Corby is alone in the Midlands in using it.

Northern England

There are several accent features which are common to most of the accents of northern England.

 Northern English tends not to have  (strut, but, etc.) as a separate vowel.
This pronunciation is found in the words that were affected by the trap–bath split.
 For many speakers, the remaining instances of RP  instead becomes : for example, in the words palm, cart, start, tomato.
 The "short a" vowel of cat, trap is normally pronounced  rather than the  found in traditional Received Pronunciation and in many forms of American English.
 In most areas, the letter y on the end of words as in happy or city is pronounced , like the i in bit, and not . This was considered RP until the 1990s. The longer  is found in the far north and in the Merseyside area.
However, the quality of these vowels varies considerably across the region, and this is considered a greater indicator of a speaker's social class than the less stigmatised aspects listed above.

Some dialect words used across the North are listed in extended editions of the Oxford Dictionary with a marker "North England": for example, the words ginnell and snicket for specific types of alleyway, the word fettle for to organise, or the use of while to mean until. The best-known Northern words are nowt, owt and summat, which are included in most dictionaries. For more localised features, see the following sections.

The "present historical" is named after the speech of the region, but it is often used in many working class dialects in the south of England too. Instead of saying "I said to him", users of the rule would say, "I says to him". Instead of saying, "I went up there", they would say, "I goes up there."

In the far north of England, the local speech is indistinguishable from Scots. Wells said that northernmost Northumberland "though politically English is linguistically Scottish".

Liverpool (Scouse)

The Liverpool accent, known as Scouse colloquially, is quite different from the accent of surrounding Lancashire. This is because Liverpool has had many immigrants in recent centuries, particularly of Irish people. Irish influences on Scouse speech include the pronunciation of unstressed 'my' as 'me', and the pronunciation of 'th' sounds like 't' or 'd' (although they remain distinct as dental  ).

Yorkshire

Wuthering Heights is one of the few classic works of English literature to contain a substantial amount of dialect. Set in Haworth, the servant Joseph speaks in the traditional dialect of the area, which many modern readers struggle to understand. This dialect was still spoken around Haworth until the late 1970s, but there is now only a minority of it still in everyday use.
The old dialect is mainly encountered in Skipton, Otley, Settle, or similar places where older farmers from deep in the dales live.
Examples of differences from RP in Yorkshire pronunciation include, but are not limited to:
H-dropping

Teesside
The accents for Teesside, usually known as Smoggy, are sometimes grouped with Yorkshire and sometimes grouped with the North-East of England, for they share characteristics with both. As this urban area grew in the early 20th century, there are fewer dialect words that date back to older forms of English; Teesside speak is the sort of modern dialect that Peter Trudgill identified in his "The Dialects of England". There is a Lower Tees Dialect group. A recent study found that most people from Middlesbrough do not consider their accent to be "Yorkshire", but that they are less hostile to being grouped with Yorkshire than to being grouped with the Geordie accent.
Intriguingly, speakers from Middlesbrough are occasionally mistaken for speakers from Liverpool as they share many of the same characteristics. It is thought the occasional similarities between the Middlesbrough and Liverpool accent may be due to the high number of Irish migration to both areas during the late 1900s in fact the 1871 census showed Middlesbrough had the second highest proportion of people from Ireland after Liverpool.  
Some examples of traits that are shared with [most parts of] Yorkshire include:
 H-dropping.
 An  sound in words such as start, car, park, etc.
 In common with the east coast of Yorkshire, words such as bird, first, nurse, etc. have an  sound. It can be written as, baird, fairst, nairse. [This vowel sound also occurs in Liverpool and Birkenhead].

Examples of traits shared with the North-East include:
 Absence of definite article reduction.

The vowel in "goat" is an  sound, as is found in both Durham and rural North Yorkshire. In common with this area of the country, Middlesbrough is a non-rhotic accent.

Lancashire

Cumbria

 People from the Furness peninsula in south Cumbria tend to have a more Lancashire-orientated accent, whilst the dialect of Barrow-in-Furness itself is a result of migration from the likes of Strathclyde and Tyneside. Barrow grew on the shipbuilding industry during the 19th and 20th centuries, and many families moved from these already well established shipbuilding towns to seek employment in Barrow.

North East England
Dialects in this region are often known as Geordie (for speakers from the Newcastle upon Tyne area) or Mackem (for speakers from the Sunderland area). The dialects across the region are broadly similar however some differences do exist. For example, with words ending -re/-er, such as culture and father, the end syllable is pronounced by a Newcastle native as a short 'a', such as in 'fat' and 'back', therefore producing "cultcha" and "fatha" for "culture" and "father" respectively. The Sunderland area would pronounce the syllable much more closely to that of other accents. Similarly, Geordies pronounce "make" in line with standard English: to rhyme with take. However, a Mackem would pronounce "make" to rhyme with "mack" or "tack" (hence the origin of the term Mackem). For other differences, see the respective articles. For an explanation of the traditional dialects of the mining areas of County Durham and Northumberland see Pitmatic.
 A feature of the North East accent, shared with Scots and Irish English, is the pronunciation of the consonant cluster -lm in coda position. As an example, "film" is pronounced as "fillum". Another of these features which are shared with Scots is the use of the word 'Aye', pronounced like 'I', its meaning is yes.

Examples of accents used by public figures

Received Pronunciation (RP): Queen Elizabeth II's accent changed slightly over the years but she still spoke a conservative form of RP until the end of her life. Margaret Thatcher, Tony Benn and Noël Coward are examples of old-fashioned RP speakers, whereas David Cameron, Boris Johnson, John Cleese and David Dimbleby are examples of contemporary RP.
Berkshire (a southern rural accent): poet Pam Ayres is from Stanford in the Vale, which belonged to Berkshire until the boundary changes of 1974.
Derby: actor Jack O'Connell.
Essex (Estuary): very strongly noticeable in YouTuber LukeIsNotSexy. Emma Blackery used to speak in a more regionally Essex dialect, but as of early 2018 has mostly transitioned into Modern RP, with subtle Americanization.
Hampshire (a southern rural accent): the late John Arlott, sports presenter and gardener Charlie Dimmock.
Hertfordshire: comedian and writer Robert Newman
Lancashire: TV personality Fred Dibnah, comedian Peter Kay, McFly singer and guitarist Danny Jones and BBC Radio 1 DJ Vernon Kay as well as Bernard Wrigley have degrees of broad Bolton accents. The actress, Michelle Holmes, has a Rochdale accent, which is similar to the western fringe of Yorkshire and she has featured mostly in Yorkshire dramas. Julie Hesmondhalgh, Vicky Entwistle and Julia Haworth, actresses in the soap opera Coronation Street, have East Lancashire accents which have a slightly different intonation and rhythm and also feature variable rhoticity.
Leicester: The band Kasabian have Leicester accents.
London: old recordings by Petula Clark, Julie Andrews, the Rolling Stones, and The Who (although many of these contain affected patterns). For clear examples, see actor Stanley Holloway (Eliza Doolittle's father in My Fair Lady), or footballer David Beckham.
Cockney: the actors Bob Hoskins and Michael Caine. Ray Winstone has quite an old-fashioned Cockney accent, and his replacement of an initial  with a  has been stigmatised. More examples can be heard in the movies Snatch and Lock, Stock, and Two Smoking Barrels. The Sex Pistols had Cockney accents, with Steve Jones having the strongest.
Mockney: used by Guy Ritchie and many musicians, it is a variant of the London regional accent characterised by a non-standard mixture of linguistic and social class characteristics.
West London: the journalist Janet Street Porter.
Estuary: athlete Sally Gunnell, the model Jordan (Katie Price).
Manchester: Oasis members Liam and Noel Gallagher, Herman's Hermits, actor Dominic Monaghan, broadcaster/podcaster Karl Pilkington, physicist Brian Cox (physicist), musician Davy Jones (The Monkees).
Merseyside (Scouse):
Liverpool: Liverpool footballers Steven Gerrard and Jamie Carragher are often cited as having particularly strong scouse accents. Recordings by The Beatles (George Harrison's accent was the strongest of the four), Gerry & The Pacemakers, Echo and the Bunnymen. Also the singer Cilla Black and the actors Craig Charles and Ricky Tomlinson. The British soap Brookside was set in Liverpool so the majority of the cast, including Philip Olivier and Jennifer Ellison, had scouse accents.
St Helens: Comedian Johnny Vegas. The comedy band the Lancashire Hotpots sing in a traditional rhotic St Helens accent.
The Wirral: Comedian and TV presenter Paul O'Grady alias Lily Savage is from Birkenhead, pop singer Pete Burns of Dead or Alive is from the model village Port Sunlight.
Nottingham: boxer Carl Froch.
Salford: actor Christopher Eccleston, bands Happy Mondays and New Order.
Stoke-on-Trent or The Potteries: pop star Robbie Williams, TV presenter Anthea Turner, ex pop star and TV presenter Jonathan Wilkes.
Sunderland (Mackem): the accent of the rock group The Futureheads is easily detected on recordings and live performances and ex-footballer Chris Waddle.
Tyneside (Geordie): former Cabinet members Alan Milburn MP and Nick Brown MP, the actors Robson Green and Tim Healy, the footballer Alan Shearer, actor and singer Jimmy Nail, rock singer Brian Johnson, singer Cheryl, television personalities Ant and Dec, Donna Air and Jayne Middlemiss.
West Country: The Vicar of Dibley was set in Oxfordshire, and many of the characters had West Country accents. 
Bristol: Professor Colin Pillinger of the Beagle 2 project, comedy writer, actor, radio DJ and director Stephen Merchant. Presenter and Comedian Justin Lee Collins.
Gloucestershire: Laurie Lee, ruralist
West Midlands: Phil Drabble, presenter of One Man and His Dog.
Birmingham (Brummie): the rock musician Ozzy Osbourne (although he sometimes Americanises his speech), Jasper Carrott and Rob Halford. See Brummie for more examples.
Coventry: the actor Clive Owen, in the films Sin City and King Arthur. Singer-songwriter Terry Hall, lead vocalist with The Specials.
Yorkshire:
Barnsley: in the 1969 film Kes, the lead characters, David Bradley and Freddie Fletcher, both have very broad Barnsley accents, which are less likely to be heard nowadays. Coronation Street actress Katherine Kelly, Sam Nixon from Pop Idol 2003, Top of the Pops Saturday and Reloaded and Level Up also has a Barnsley accent. Also, chat show host Michael Parkinson and ex-union leader Arthur Scargill have slightly reduced Barnsley accents.
Bradford: singers Gareth Gates, Zayn Malik of One Direction and Kimberley Walsh of Girls Aloud. In Rita, Sue and Bob Too, Bob has a Bradford accent whilst Rita and Sue sound more like Lancashire.
Hemsworth: cricketer Geoffrey Boycott has an accent similar to those found in many old coal-mining towns
Holme Valley: Actors Peter Sallis and Bill Owen of Last of the Summer Wine and Sallis in Wallace and Gromit (although Sallis and Owen themselves were both Londoners)
Hull: Actors Tom Courtenay and Reece Shearsmith, and singer-songwriter Paul Heaton.
Leeds: Melanie Brown of the Spice Girls and Beverley Callard who plays Liz McDonald in Coronation Street, singer Corinne Bailey Rae, the band Kaiser Chiefs, model Nell McAndrew, actress Angela Griffin, Radio DJ Chris Moyles, Comedian Leigh Francis alias Keith Lemon
Scarborough: the film Little Voice
Sheffield: Ken Loach's 1977 film The Price of Coal was filmed almost entirely in the traditional dialect of the Sheffield-Rotherham area, but this variety of speech is receding. For examples of less marked Sheffield speech, see Sean Bean, the band Pulp, the film The Full Monty and the band Arctic Monkeys.
South Humber: former England manager Graham Taylor and motorcycle racer Guy Martin.
Wakefield: singer and actress Jane McDonald, Hollyoaks actress Claire Cooper, actor Reece Dinsdale, Coronation Street Helen Worth, the band the Cribs

Regional English accents in the media
The Archers has had characters with a variety of different West Country accents (see Mummerset).

The shows of Ian La Frenais and Dick Clement have often included a variety of regional accents, the most notable being Auf Wiedersehen Pet about Geordie men in Germany. Porridge featured London and Cumberland accents, and The Likely Lads featured north east England.

The programmes of Carla Lane such as The Liver Birds and Bread featured Scouse accents.

In the 2005 version of the science fiction programme Doctor Who, various Londoners wonder why the Doctor (played by Christopher Eccleston), an alien, sounds as if he comes from the North. Eccleston used his own Salford accent in the role; the Doctor's usual response is "Lots of planets have a North!" Other accents in the same series include Cockney (used by actress Billie Piper) and Estuary (used by actress Catherine Tate).

A television reality programme Rock School was set in Suffolk in its second series, providing lots of examples of the Suffolk dialect.

See also

American and British English differences
Languages of England
Linguistic purism in English
Regional accents of English speakers

Notes

References

 
 McArthur, Tom (2002). Oxford Guide to World English. Oxford: Oxford University Press.  hardback,  paperback.
 Peters, Pam (2004). The Cambridge Guide to English Usage. Cambridge: Cambridge University Press. .

Further reading
 Partridge, A. C. (1969). Tudor to Augustan English: a Study in Syntax and Style, from Caxton to Johnson, in series, The Language Library. London: A. Deutsch. 242 p. SBN 233-96092-9

External links
 IANA language tag for eng-GB-oed
 British National Corpus. (Official website for the BNC.)
English Accents and Dialects: searchable free-access archive of 681 English English speech samples, wma format with linguistic commentary including phonetic transcriptions in X-SAMPA, British Library Collect Britain website.
 Online British English and American English pronunciation courses
  . (Advocates -ise spellings.)
 For the Yorkshire dialect

 
Languages of England